Sonny Boy Williamson may refer to either of the two 20th-century American blues harmonica players, who both recorded in Chicago: 

Sonny Boy Williamson I (19141948), born John Lee Curtis Williamson
Sonny Boy Williamson II (1965), born Alex Ford; known as Aleck "Rice" Miller, among other names